The Friedrichshain Photo Gallery is the oldest communal photo gallery in Berlin. Founded in 1985, it was the first gallery in the GDR which devoted itself exclusively to the medium of photography. Today it is located at Helsingforser Platz 1 in Berlin-Friedrichshain, not far from the S-train station Warschauer Straße, and has been operated since 2002 by Kulturring in Berlin eV. The emphasis is on social documentary photography.

In August 2015 the Friedrichshain Photo Gallery celebrated its thirtieth anniversary with a great look back on its previous work. In addition to numerous photographers who have shaped the gallery and photography, co-founder Ralf Herzig also officially returned to the gallery for the first time.

Selected artists 

 Cecil Beaton
 Sibylle Bergemann
 Dietmar Bührer
 Imogen Cunningham
 Arno Fischer
 Harald Hauswald
 Eugen Heilig
 Ute Mahler
 Sven Marquardt
 Roger Melis
 Tina Modotti
 Helga Paris
 Gordon Parks
 Richard Peter
 Evelyn Richter
 Willy Römer
 Sebastião Salgado
 Rudolf Schäfer
 Eva Siao
 Jindřich Štreit
 Ulrich Wüst

References

Photography museums and galleries in Germany
Art museums and galleries in Berlin